Joseph Dougherty is an American television producer, writer, and director.  He has written for such television series as Thirtysomething, for which he won an Emmy Award and a Humanitas Prize.

Dougherty has also written for Judging Amy, Saving Grace, Pretty Little Liars, and the HBO film Cast a Deadly Spell.

Stage works 
 1971 - Goodbye Bob and Ray - Unproduced
 1972 - Reading or The Midnight Horror Show - Lolly's Theatre Club, NYC 
 1977 - Denouement - produced under the title Murder for Pleasure - Arena Players Repertory - East Farmingdale,NY
 1985Digby 
 1992-93 - My Favorite Year - Book - Lincoln Center Theater

Filmography
Zoe Busiek: Wild Card
Once and Again
Cast a Deadly Spell
Steel and Lace
Tales of the Unexpected (aka Roald Dahl's Tales of the Unexpected)
Saving Grace (consulting producer)
Saved (co-executive producer)
Clubhouse
Presidio Med
Georgetown
Judging Amy (consulting producer)
Pirates of Silicon Valley
Hyperion Bay (executive producer)
Harvey (1996 TV film)
Abandoned and Deceived
Witch Hunt (TV film)
Attack of the 50 Ft. Woman
Thirtysomething
Pretty Little Liars
Ravenswood
  Belanida (1970, Unproduced)

Awards and nominations

References

External links
 

American male screenwriters
American television writers
American television producers
Living people
American male television writers
Year of birth missing (living people)